The 2013 FA Women's Cup Final was the 43rd final of the FA Women's Cup, England's primary cup competition for women's football teams. The showpiece event was the 20th to be played directly under the auspices of the Football Association (FA). The final was contested between Arsenal Ladies and Bristol Academy on 26 May 2013 at Keepmoat Stadium in Doncaster. Holders Arsenal made its 12th final win.  The win marked the first team trophy for new head coach Shelley Kerr.

Details

References

External links
 The FA Women's Cup

Cup
Women's FA Cup finals
FA Women's Cup Final
FA Women's Cup Final, 2013
FA Women's Cup Final, 2013